The Pouakai Range is an eroded and heavily vegetated stratovolcano in the North Island of New Zealand, located northwest of Mount Taranaki. It consists of the remains of a collapsed Pleistocene stratovolcano. The range is surrounded by a ring plain of lahar deposits from a massive collapse that has been dated as roughly 250,000 years old.

The region has been reshaped more recently after each cone collapse from Mount Taranaki.

Geology
The Pouakai Range volcano is situated in the Taranaki Basin and is part of the Taranaki Volcanic Lineament which has had a 30 mm/yr north to south migration over the last 1.75 million years. Present-day seismicity and stress directions in eastern Taranaki are consistent with back-arc extension processes.  The Taranaki Volcanic Lineament members as they decrease in age from northwest to southeast are:
Paritutu, and the Sugar Loaf Islands from 1.75 Ma
Kaitake from 575 ka
Pouakai 210–250 ka
Mount Taranaki <200 ka

Volcanic activity 
"After the extinction of the Kaitake center, eruptions broke out at Pouakai 6 miles south-east of Kaitake. Activity from this center continued over a long period of ring-plain formation, a period of marine erosion during which volcanic activity decreased, and part way through another period of ring-plain building, before activity broke out from the next center." It can be postulated that that all volcanoes in the Taranaki Volcanic Lineament have had a similar potential for instability and were stratovolcanoes of similar size and shape to the present Mount Taranaki between major collapse events given their debris plains. They may well have had major collapse cycles similar to that presently shown by Mount Taranaki which is a potential maximum size of collapse of  every 30,000 to 35,000 years.

Nearby volcanoes
Sugar Loaf Islands
Kaitake Volcano
Taranaki Volcano

References

Mountain ranges of Taranaki
Volcanoes of Taranaki
Stratovolcanoes of New Zealand
Pleistocene stratovolcanoes